Boutheina (also spelled Bothayna or Buthaina) is an Arabic given name for females. People with the name include:

 Boutheina Jabnoun Marai, Tunisian journalist
 Bouthaina Shaaban, Syrian politician
 Bouthayna Shaya, Syrian actress and voice actress
 Buthaina Al-Yaqoubi, Omani athlete

Arabic feminine given names